Tomislav Draganja (born 10 August 1994) is a Croatian tennis player. Draganja usually competes on the ATP Challenger Tour

Draganja primarily focuses on doubles, where he has a career high ATP doubles ranking of 115 achieved on 26 February 2018. Draganja has won 4 Challenger doubles titles and 9 ITF Futures doubles titles on the ITF Men's Circuit.

Draganja made his ATP main draw debut in doubles at the 2016 Croatia Open Umag, receiving doubles main draw wildcard alongside Nino Serdarušić.

His older brother is a professional tennis player Marin Draganja.

ATP career finals

Doubles: 1 (1 runner-up)

Challenger and Futures finals

Doubles: 33 (13–20)

References

External links
 
 

1994 births
Living people
Croatian male tennis players
Tennis players from Split, Croatia
21st-century Croatian people